Peter Ross-Edwards  (11 July 1922 – 10 October 2012) was an Australian politician, who became Leader of the National Party in the Victorian Parliament.

He was born in Corowa to Rupert Ross-Edwards, a minister of religion, and Una Regan. He attended state schools in Corowa and then Geelong Grammar School, after which he enlisted in the Royal Australian Air Force in 1942. He served in the United Kingdom, Italy, North America and the Middle East as a flying officer, but shortly after he was discharged in 1946 he was hospitalised with tuberculosis, remaining in care until 1948.

After leaving hospital he studied law at Melbourne University, graduating with a Bachelor's degree and becoming a solicitor. From 1952 he was a solicitor in Shepparton.

He was also active in the Country Party, serving as secretary and treasurer of the Shepparton branch from 1957 to 1967. In 1967 he was elected to the Victorian Legislative Assembly as the member for Shepparton. He was elected parliamentary leader of the party in 1970, a post he held until 1988 (the party changed its name to the National Party of Australia in 1982).

He was appointed a Member of the Order of Australia in 1989. Ross-Edwards resigned from parliament in 1991, and was Chief Commissioner of the City of Greater Bendigo from 1994 to 1995.

He died in 2012.

References

1922 births
2012 deaths
National Party of Australia members of the Parliament of Victoria
Members of the Victorian Legislative Assembly
Members of the Order of Australia
Royal Australian Air Force personnel of World War II
University of Melbourne alumni
Australian solicitors
People educated at Geelong Grammar School